Fernanda Keller (born 4 October 1963) is a professional triathlete from Brazil who was the first Brazilian woman to medal in the Ironman Triathlon World Championships.

She is the only female athlete in the world to have taken part in 23 consecutive years and to have achieved 14 top-ten finishes in this race. She finished the Ironman Triathlon World Championships in Kailua-Kona, Hawaii in third place in 1994, 1995, 1997, 1998, 1999 and 2000. She won Ironman Brazil three times (2000, 2004 and 2008) and was four times runner-up.

Her first triathlon was 1983 in Rio de Janeiro during her time at the university. Thirty years later, just a few days after her 50th birthday in 2013, she participated in Ironman Hawaii for the 24th time; completing it in 11:03 hours and placing sixth out of 55 women in her age group.

Her Instituto Fernanda Keller, a social institution for 700 adolescents from 7 up to 18 years, has been in business since she founded it in September 1998. In 2012 she launched a collection of fitness and casual apparel.

Notes

External links
 Official website
 Triresults - Ironman Hawaii World Champions
 Ironman Webpage

1963 births
Living people
Sportspeople from Niterói
Brazilian female triathletes
Brazilian people of German descent